The Church of St. Michael is an early-Romanesque church in Hildesheim, Germany. It has been on the UNESCO World Cultural Heritage list (along with the nearby Hildesheim Cathedral) since 1985 because of its outstanding Romanesque architecture and art. It is now a shared church, the main church being Lutheran and the crypt being Roman Catholic.

History
Bishop Bernward of Hildesheim (996–1022) built a Benedictine monastery from the ground up on a hill linked with the archangel Michael just a half kilometer north of the city walls of his seat (Hildesheim), a monastery that featured an imposing church some 70 meters in length overall. Bernward set the first stone for the new church in 1010 and dedicated the still unfinished building to Michael on the archangel's feast day, 29 September 1022, just a few weeks before his death. Construction, however, continued under his successor, Bishop Godehard (died 1038), who completed the work in 1031 and reconsecrated the church to Michael on September 29 of that year.  The church has double choirs east and west, double tripartite transepts at either end of the nave, and six towers—two large ones over the crossings east and west, and four other tall and narrow ones attached to the small sides of the two transepts.  The eastern choir featured three apses, and the west had a deep chapel with a huge single apse rising high over an elaborate cross-vaulted hall crypt with an ambulatory.  Bishop Bernward's remains were placed in the western crypt.

The monastery comprised a church family and had two other sanctuaries dedicated to Martin and the Holy Cross lying in the cloister that extended northward from St. Michael's north flank.  The monastery and church opened southward toward the city of Hildesheim, its south flank comprising a facade of a sort.  It seems likely that the monastery on the Hill of St. Michael was surrounded by a wall.

In 1186, after a reconstruction following a fire, Hildesheim's Bishop Adelog of Dorstedt – assisted by Tammo, Prince-Bishop of Verden – reconsecrated St. Michael's.

When the people of Hildesheim became Protestant in 1542, St. Michael's became Lutheran, but the Benedictine monastery operated here until it was secularized in 1803. Monks continued to use the church, especially its western choir and crypt, down to that moment.

St. Michael's Church was heavily damaged in an air raid during World War II on 22 March 1945, but reconstruction was begun in 1950 and completed in 1957. In 1985, the church became a UNESCO World Cultural Heritage site, along with the Cathedral of Hildesheim, its collection of medieval treasures and its 1000-year-old rosebush.

Architecture 
St. Michael's Church is one of the most important churches of early Christian period architecture. It is a double-choir basilica with two transepts and a square tower at each crossing. The west choir is emphasized by an ambulatory and a crypt. Nikolaus Pevsner wrote that St. Michael's "is the earliest surviving example of a truly Romanesque exterior."

The ground plan of the building follows a geometrical conception, in which the square of the transept crossing in the ground plan constitutes the key measuring unit for the entire church. The square units are defined by the alternation of columns and piers. Pevsner described this as a "more thorough 'metrical system' " than found in any prior Romanesque architecture.

The ceiling of the church is decorated with a fresco, 27.6 m long and 8.7 m wide, depicting the Tree of Jesse, the ancestral line of Jesus. The genealogy has been dated to roughly 1130. The famous Bernward Doors, featuring bronze reliefs of scenes from the Bible, were originally commissioned for St. Michael's but are now found at the nearby Cathedral of Hildesheim.

Measurements
 Total length: 74.75 m
 Total length of the transepts: 40.01 m
 Total width of the transepts: 11.38 m
 Length of the crypt: 18.36 m
 Length of the nave: 27.34 m
 Width of the nave incl. lower aisles: 22.75 m
 Width of the nave without lower aisles: 8.60 m
 Height of the nave without lower aisles: 16.70 m
 Thickness of the walls: 1.63 m

Location
St. Michael's Church is situated at the Western rim of the city centre of Hildesheim, on the so-called Michaelishügel ("St. Michael's Hill"). The main entrance to the Church is at the south side. Magdalenengarten, a baroque park, is very close to the church in the west. The cloister is also accessible from there. It leads to the Church's contemporary (administrative) buildings. From the south and east of the Hill is Hildesheim's downtown, to the west is the River Innerste and in the north the Gymnasium Andreanum school.

Burials
Bernward of Hildesheim

See also
 Bernward Column
 Saint Michael in the Catholic Church

References

External links

 St Mary's Cathedral and St Michael's Church at Hildesheim / UNESCO Official Website

 Introduction to the Michaeliskirche (Hornemann Institut)
 Exhibition "Bernwards Schätze" (Bernward's Treasures) online Hannoverische Allgemeine photo gallery 
 St. Michael's Church, Hildesheim on sekulada.com 

Hildesheim
Hildesheim
Hildesheim
Hildesheim 
Lutheran churches in Hildesheim
Hildesheim
Hildesheim
Hildesheim
Hildesheim
Hildesheim
Hildesheim